The 1st World Festival of Youth and Students featured an athletics competition among its programme of events. The events were contested in Prague, Czechoslovakia in August 1947. Mainly contested among Eastern European athletes, it served as an alternative to the more Western European-oriented 1947 International University Games held in Paris the same year.

Prominent competitors included Ivan Gubijan, Wacław Kuźmicki and Olga Šicnerová, all of whom later participated at the 1948 Summer Olympics. Double sprint gold medallist Ion Moina's feats later led to the Stadionul Ion Moina being named in his honour. Přemysl Hajný won a shot put and discus throw double in the men's section and later won an Olympic silver medal in ice hockey at the 1948 Winter Olympics. Only one medallist in the women's section was from outside of Poland and Czechoslovakia.

Medal summary

Men

Women

Medal table

References

Results
World Student Games (UIE). GBR Athletics. Retrieved on 2014-12-09.

World Festival of Youth and Students
1947 in Czechoslovak sport
World Festival of Youth and Students
World Festival of Youth and Students
Sports competitions in Prague
1947